Godfrey James Macdonald, 8th Baron Macdonald of Sleat (born 28 November 1947), is a Scottish nobleman, landowner and head of Clan Donald.

He is the second child and oldest son of Alexander Godfrey Macdonald, 7th Baron Macdonald of Sleat, and his wife Anne Whitaker. He was educated at Eton College.

He married Claire Catlow OBE on 14 June 1969. The couple has three daughters and a son:
 Hon. Alexandra Louise Macdonald, b. 19 Aug 1973, married the German-Austrian nobleman and landowner Philipp zu Guttenberg (b. 1973), brother of German politician Karl-Theodor zu Guttenberg
 Hon. Isabella Claire Macdonald, b. 2 Oct 1975
 Hon. Meriel Iona Macdonald, b. 1978
 Hon. (Godfrey Evan) Hugo Thomas Macdonald, b. 24 Feb 1982.

Lady Macdonald is a noted cook and food writer.

Lord Macdonald succeeded to the title Baron Macdonald in 1970 on the death of his father.

He was an elected member of Invernessshire County Council 1970–1975 and of Skye and Lochalsh District Council 1975–1983.

He is Chief of the Clan Donald.

References

1947 births
Living people
8
People educated at Eton College